Hawthorne Gardening Company, formed in October 2014, is The Scotts Miracle-Gro Companys subsidiary for cannabis growers and one of the first major investments by a major United States corporation in the cannabis industry.

Background 
Hawthorne Gardening was created "to meet the demands of hydroponic growers (a.k.a. cannabis growers) ... [it] markets itself [to them] using language that's in line with the free-spirited, artisanal cannabis farmer." The business made its first cannabis-related investment in April 2015, when it bought General Hydroponics, a 35-year old liquid nutrient maker, called by High Times "the standard for hydroponic growers". After the 2015 purchase, a Hawthorne executive told the press, "the lion's share of General Hydroponics business in North America is cannabis growers". Scotts' CEO decided to spin off a cannabis business after a 2013 visit to a garden store in Yakima, Washington with a large section of hydroponic equipment. According to Forbes, Scotts had invested more than $250 million in the subsidiary by mid 2016. In March 2018, the Hawthorne Gardening Company and The Flowr Corporation (a Canadian Licensed Producer of medical cannabis) announced an R&D partnership, building North America's first dedicated facility for cannabis research and development.

References

Further reading

External links

American companies established in 2014
Cannabis companies of the United States
Companies based in Nassau County, New York 
Agriculture companies established in 2014